Ashling is the third book in the Obernewtyn series by Isobelle Carmody.

Synopsis
The powerful Misfit Elspeth is sent to Sutrium, the seat of the ruling totalitarian Council, to seal an alliance between the secret community at Obernewtyn and the rebel forces. Yet her journey takes her far beyond the borders of the Land, across the sea into the heart of the mysterious desert region, Sador. There she seeks help to destroy the weaponmachines but before her dark quest can begin, she must learn the truth of her dream: why the Beforetimers destroyed their world...

Reception

Awards and nominations
In 1996, Ashling was shortlisted for "Young Adult Novel" in the Aurealis Award.

Publication history

Single Book Publications:

Combined Volumes:

References

External links

1995 Australian novels
1995 science fiction novels
Children's science fiction novels
Australian science fiction novels
Australian fantasy novels
Australian young adult novels
Science fantasy novels
Obernewtyn Chronicles